Qarah Kahriz or Qareh Kahriz may refer to:
 Qarah Kahriz, Markazi
 Qarah Kahriz, Chaypareh, West Azerbaijan Province
 Qarah Kahriz, Showt, West Azerbaijan Province
 Qarah Kahriz, Zanjan
 Qarah Kahriz District, in Markazi Province
 Qarah Kahriz Rural District, in Markazi Province